Anne Collins (born 1952) is a Canadian writer, editor and publishing executive who won the Governor General's Award for English-language non-fiction in 1988.

Born in Whitby, Ontario, Collins earned a Bachelor of Arts from York University and has held a wide range of writing and editorial jobs in the Canadian publishing and magazine industry. The publisher at Knopf Random Canada Publishing Group and vice-president of Random House of Canada, Collins has also written the award-winning In the Sleep Room: The Story of The CIA Brainwashing Experiments in Canada.  In the Sleep Room explored the history of Dr. Ewen Cameron and Montreal's Allan Memorial Institute and was made into a movie directed by Anne Wheeler in 1998.

Works
 The big evasion: abortion, the issue that won't go away (1985)
 In the Sleep Room: the story of the CIA brainwashing experiments in Canada (1988)

See also
David Orlikow
MKULTRA

References

1952 births
Governor General's Award-winning non-fiction writers
20th-century Canadian women writers
20th-century Canadian non-fiction writers
Canadian magazine editors
Canadian publishers (people)
Living people
Writers from Ontario
People from Whitby, Ontario
Canadian women non-fiction writers
Women magazine editors